Habbo is a social networking hotel game site.

Habbo may also refer to:

 Habbo, Morocco, a settlement